Thumbida Koda is a 1964 Indian Kannada-language film directed by N. C. Rajan and produced by G. K. Venkatesh & Friends. The film stars Rajkumar, Leelavathi, K. S. Ashwath, Narasimharaju and Balakrishna.

The film has musical score by Venkatesh who also lent his voice for a song. The film features cameo appearances by singer P. Kalinga Rao and writer A. N. Krishna Rao.

Cast

Soundtrack

Background music for the film was composed by G. K. Venkatesh, who also scored its soundtrack. The soundtrack album consists of three tracks.

References

External links 
 

1964 films
1960s Kannada-language films
Films scored by G. K. Venkatesh